Helga Konrad (born 10 January 1948) is an Austrian politician.

Life 

Konrad was born and grew up in Graz. She studied English and Romance philology at the University of Graz and in Paris, completing a doctorate in 1975.

She is a member of the Social Democratic Party of Austria (SPÖ), and in 1987 became a city councillor in Graz. She was elected to the National Council in the 1990 Austrian legislative election. Konrad briefly returned to local politics in Graz in 1993 until she succeeded Johanna Dohnal as Federal Minister for Women's Affairs in April 1995 on the government of Franz Vranitzky, remaining in office until the chancellor's resignation in 1997.

Konrad's most impactful project was a campaign to promote equal participation in household chores between genders. In 1999 Konrad received the Grand Decoration of Honour in Silver with Star for Services to the Republic of Austria.

Konrad is considered an expert on combating human trafficking. From 2000 until 2004 she led a Stability Pact for South Eastern Europe task force against human trafficking, and in 2004 was appointed as the Organization for Security and Co-operation in Europe's special representative for the issue.

References

External links 
 
 

1948 births
Living people
Politicians from Graz
Government ministers of Austria
Women government ministers of Austria
Members of the National Council (Austria)
Recipients of the Grand Decoration with Star for Services to the Republic of Austria
Social Democratic Party of Austria politicians